Access Bank Kenya (ABK), whose complete name is Access Bank (Kenya) PLC, formerly Transnational Bank Kenya PLC, is a commercial bank in Kenya. It is licensed and regulated by the Central Bank of Kenya, the national banking regulator.

History
TNB was established as a non-bank financial institution (NBFI) in 1984, under the name Transnational Finance Company (TNFC). TNFC provided loans, including lease-purchase arrangements to depositors and non-depositors. In 1985, following the issuance of a commercial banking license by the Central Bank of Kenya, the national banking regulator, the company began banking operations under its current name in Nairobi and Mombasa. At first other locations in the country continued to operate as TNFC offices. Between 1985 and 1996, all TNFC activities were merged with TNB and the TNFC brand was closed. The bank has one subsidiary; TNB Forex Bureau, located at Moi International Airport in Mombasa. The bank is also affiliated with Western Union, the American International money-transfer service. In 2009, TNB introduced Internet banking and mobile banking through mobile telephones.

Overview
The bank is a medium-sized commercial bank in Kenya, East Africa's largest economy. , its assets were valued at about US$105.84 million (KES:10.53 billion), with shareholders' equity of about US$20.43 million (KES:2.033 billion).

Branch network
The bank maintained 17 networked branches in Kenya, as of December 2013.

Ownership
The shares of stock of Transnational Bank are privately held by Kenyan institutions and individuals. , the major shareholders in the bank were as depicted in the table below:

Acquisition
On 31 October 2019 the Business Daily Africa newspaper reported that Access Bank Nigeria, had received regulatory approval from the Competition Authority of Kenya (CAK) to acquire 93.57 percent in Transnational Bank of Kenya. The transaction had yet to receive the approval of the Central Bank of Kenya, as of October 2019.

In January 2020, the Central Bank of Kenya gave approval for Access Bank Group to acquire up to 100 percent shareholding in Transnational Bank. In August 2020, the take-over was consummated after the new owners paid KES:1.4 billion (approx. US$13 million) to buy-out the previous shareholders. The bank re-branded to Access Bank (Kenya) PLC.

Pending merger
When the deal by Access Bank Group to acquire Sidian Bank is concluded, it is expected that the new acquisition will be merged into Access Bank Kenya. When that happens, the combined bank is expected to have assets valued at over KSh57.1 billion (approx. US$492 million), with loans totaling KSh26.6 billion (approx. US$229 million). The deal requires regulatory approval in Kenya and Nigeria.

See also
 List of banks in Kenya
 Central Bank of Kenya
 Economy of Kenya

References

Banks of Kenya
Banks established in 1984
1984 establishments in Kenya
Companies based in Nairobi
Access Bank Group